Bernice Wildlife Management Area is a wildlife management area located northeast of Melita, Manitoba, Canada.

History
Bernice Wildlife Management Area was established in 1974 under the Manitoba Wildlife Act.

The WMA is in an area known locally as 'Poverty Plains'. Farming in the area was abandoned during the drought in the 1930s and the land is now reclaimed for wildlife habitat.

Geography
The area lies southeast of Bernice. Its eastern boundary is adjacent to Corner Diamond Road. There are no facilities for visitors. It is within the Souris River Watershed.

Ecology
The area is within the Oak Lake Ecodistrict within the Aspen Parkland Ecoregion in the Prairies Ecozone.

Bird species found in the WMA include:
Sharp-tailed grouse
Ruffed grouse
Gray partridge
Baird's sparrow
Loggerhead shrike
Sprague's pipit
Savannah sparrow
Lark bunting
Chestnut-collared longspur

Mammal species found in the WMA include:
Short-tailed weasel
Red fox
Badger
Long-tailed weasel
Coyote
White-tailed deer

See also
 List of wildlife management areas in Manitoba
 List of protected areas of Manitoba

References

External links
 iNaturalist: Bernice Wildlife Management Area

Protected areas established in 1974
Wildlife management areas of Manitoba